The 1980 United States Senate election in California took place on November 4, 1980. Incumbent Democrat U.S. Senator Alan Cranston easily won re-election to a third term, even as the state's former Republican governor, Ronald Reagan, won a landslide victory in the concurrent presidential election, and a target of the National Conservative Political Action Committee.

Primary elections
Primary elections were held on June 3, 1980.

Democratic primary

Candidates
Alan Cranston, incumbent United States Senator
Richard Morgan
David Rees
Frank L. Thomas

Results

Republican primary

Candidates
Paul Gann, political activist
Rayburn Hanzlik, former Nixon and Ford staffer
Brian Hyndman
John G. Schmitz, State Senator and American Independent Party candidate for President in 1972
Philip Schwartz
Sam Yorty, former Mayor of Los Angeles, and Democratic nominee in 1954
James A. Ware, nominee for Controller in 1978

Results

Results

See also 
 1980 United States Senate elections

References 

1980
California
1980 California elections